Kerava is a town and municipality within the Uusimaa region of   Finland. The municipalities of Vantaa, Sipoo and Tuusula are adjacent to Kerava, which is part of the Helsinki metropolitan area.

Kerava is the 30th largest municipality in terms of population, but the 5th smallest municipality in terms of area in Finland (and the second smallest in the Uusimaa region after Kauniainen). However, it is also the third most densely populated area in the sub-region after Helsinki and Kauniainen. The municipality is unilingually Finnish.

The Sinebrychoff brewery operations are based in Kerava. There is also a well-known prison in the town (Keravan vankila), which includes 94 places in the open prison ward.

History
Until the Middle Ages, Kerava was a wilderness, until two villages, Ylikerava ("Upper Kerava") and Alikerava ("Lower Kerava"), were created along the Kerava River (Keravanjoki). The first signs of established village settlement date back to the 1440s. Kerava was annexed to Tuusula when the Tuusula parish was founded in 1643. In 1862, the railway between Helsinki and Hämeenlinna was opened, which quickly brought industry to agricultural Kerava; the carpentry factory in Kerava was established in 1908, and the wood industry became an important factor in the development of the town. The coat of arms designed by Ahti Hammar features a woodworking joints made by a carpenter.

In 1924, Kerava was separated from Tuusula as its own township. At that time, it had a population of about 3,000. Originally, it also included part of the Korso area, and Korso railway station was also located in the township area. However, from 1954 onwards, the entire Korso was annexed to the then Helsinki Rural Municipality. During the peak periods of the late 1960s and 1970s, the population almost doubled due to immigration and good transport connections, and new suburbs were created in Kurkela, Kilta and Untola. Kerava was officially granted town rights in 1970.

Demographics

Transport
Kerava has two railway stations, Kerava Central Railway Station and Savio station. The Kerava Central Railway Station is an interchange station, with connections from the main track from Helsinki to Riihimäki to the tracks to Lahti and Porvoo. The Helsinki Airport (HEL) is located about 15 kilometers to the southwest of the city by car. It is  along Highway 4 (E75) from Kerava to the city center of Helsinki.

The city of Kerava joined Helsinki Regional Transport Authority (HSL) in 2010.

Culture

Food
Many garlic dishes were named traditional food of Kerava parish in the 1980s: Yrjö's lamb (à la Jorgos), garlic potatoes and crushed garlic in oil, and, as a dessert, a gooseberry pie with vanilla sauce.

Politics
Results of the 2019 Finnish parliamentary election in Kerava:

Social Democratic Party 19,8%
National Coalition Party 19,3%
Finns Party 19,0%
Green League 12,9%
Left Alliance 8,6%
Centre Party 6,8%
Movement Now (common list of Uusimaa) 4,4%
Christian Democrats 3,2%
Blue Reform 1,9%

Notable people from Kerava
 President J. K. Paasikivi (1870–1956), lived in Kerava since 1917 to the 1940s
 Hanna-Maria Seppälä (b. 1984), Finnish freestyle swimmer
Volmari Iso-Hollo (1907–1969), Olympic medalist
 Jean Sibelius (1865–1957), Finnish composer
Väinö Bremer (1899-1964), Finnish Olympic medalist biathlete and pilot died here in a plane crash

See also
 Järvenpää
 Kerava River
 Nikkilä
 Sinebrychoff

References

External links

Town of Kerava – Official website (In Finnish) Information - Official Websites (In English)
Satellite photo of Kerava

 
Greater Helsinki
Cities and towns in Finland
Populated places established in 1970
1970 establishments in Finland